The Sou'wester 51 CC is an American sailboat that was designed by McCurdy & Rhodes as a racer-cruiser and first built in 1986.

The Sou'wester 51 CC is a center cockpit development of the Sou'wester 51.

Production
The design was built by Hinckley Yachts in the United States, starting in 1986, but it is now out of production.

Design
The Sou'wester 51 CC is a recreational keelboat, built predominantly of fiberglass, with wood trim. It has a masthead sloop rig; a raked stem; a raised counter, angled transom, a rudder controlled by a wheel and a fixed fin keel with a retractable centerboard. A fin keel and a shoal draft Sheel keel were both factory options. The boat displaces  and carries  of lead ballast.

It is fitted with a inboard engine for docking and maneuvering.

The design has sleeping accommodation for eight people, with a double "V"-berth in the bow cabin, an "U"-shaped settee with a drop-down table and a straight settee in the main cabin and two aft cabins with a double berth on the starboard side and a single berth on the port side. The galley is located on the starboard side just aft of the companionway ladder. The galley is equipped with a three-burner stove, an ice box and a double sink. A navigation station is opposite the galley, on the port side. There are two heads, one just aft of the bow cabin on the port side and one on the port side in the aft cabin. Both have showers.

See also
List of sailing boat types

References

Keelboats
1980s sailboat type designs
Sailing yachts
Sailboat type designs by McCurdy & Rhodes
Sailboat types built by Hinckley Yachts